Daish is a surname. Notable people with the surname include:

 Andrew Daish (born 1984), Welsh-born Swedish rugby union footballer
 Ella Daish, British environmental activist
 Jake Barker-Daish (born 1993), Australian soccer player
 Liam Daish (born 1968), English-born Irish footballer